Ozark Civic Center is a 4,000-seat multipurpose arena located in Ozark, Alabama. It is primarily used for basketball, and was built in 1975. It is also used for conventions, concerts, trade shows and other events.

See also
List of convention centers in the United States

External links
Southeast Alabama Civic Centers
Ozark Civic Center

Convention centers in Alabama
Indoor arenas in Alabama
Sports venues in Alabama
Buildings and structures in Dale County, Alabama
Sports venues completed in 1975
1975 establishments in Alabama